New York's 62nd State Senate district is one of 63 districts in the New York State Senate. It has been represented by Republican Rob Ortt, currently the Senate Minority Leader, since 2015.

Geography
District 62 covers all of Niagara and Orleans Counties, including the city of Niagara Falls, as well as the towns of Sweden and Ogden in Monroe County.

The district overlaps with New York's 24th, 25th, and 26th congressional districts, and with the 134th, 139th, 140th, 144th, 145th, and 146th districts of the New York State Assembly.

Recent election results

2020

2018

2016

2014

2012

Federal results in District 62

References

62